LBO may stand for:
 Floyd W. Jones Lebanon Airport (FAA LID: LBO), an airport in Laclede County, Missouri, U.S.
 Lanka Business Online, an online news publisher in Sri Lanka
 Left Business Observer, an economics newsletter published by Doug Henwood
 Leveraged buyout, a method of acquiring a company
 Lithium triborate (LiB3O5), a non-linear optics crystal
 Landing Barge, Oiler a World War 2 ship.
 Long Beach Opera, an American opera company in southern California
 Loughborough railway station, Leicestershire, England, National Rail station code
 LBO Ladies Bowling Tour, sponsored by Daigaku Honyaku Center
DHC Ladies Bowling Tour